Mary Mensah (born 24 June 1963) is a Ghanaian sprinter. She competed in the women's 4 × 100 metres relay at the 1984 Summer Olympics.

References

External links
 

1963 births
Living people
Athletes (track and field) at the 1984 Summer Olympics
Ghanaian female sprinters
Olympic athletes of Ghana
Place of birth missing (living people)
Olympic female sprinters